The sinner's prayer is an evangelical Christian term referring to any prayer of repentance.

Sinner's prayer may also refer to:

 "Sinner's Prayer", a song by Lowell Fulson and Lloyd Glenn, included in the Ray Charles Genius Loves Company album (2004)
 "Sinner's Prayer", a song by Lady Gaga from Joanne
 "Sinner's Prayer", a song by Beth Hart from Don't Explain